Oscar Mbongeni Ndlovu, is a South African record producer, podcaster and DJ. He creates house music containing elements of deep house, deep tech, Nu Jazz, broken beat and Lounge music.

He is best known for his founding and starring roles in the entertainment podcast, The Ashmed Hour show.

Early life
Oscar Mbo was born in Pretoria and raised in a Kriel, Mpumalanga west of Witbank where he spent much of his childhood.

Career
In September 2019, he released his debut EP, Life & Love and later in November launched his debut album, Golden Power. He is also a member of the trio group Golden Boys Entertainment.

He has also been featured on Kaya FM's Platinum Friday with T-Bose, Metro FM, TransAfrica Radio and on the Vuzu music television show, Hit Refresh. He has received an endorsement from Diesel. 

In 2019, he did his first international tour in DJOON Club in Paris for DJ Shimza's One Man Show as well as in Mozambique. He has also performed and headlined in festivals such as the House Musiq Festival in Swaziland and the Wololo Music Festival in Witbank.

In October 2020, he released his second studio album titled, For The Groovists, which was nominated for the 27th South African Music Awards for Dance album and featured amapiano producer Kabza De Small.

In February 2021, he performed at Blizz Lounge in Pretoria alongside singer Brian Temba.

In July 2021, he released his EP titled, Defenders of House.

Discography
 Love & Life EP (2019)
 Golden Power (2019)
 For The Groovists (2020)
 Defenders of House (2021)
 Groovy Since 90 Sumthin'  (2022)

Awards and nominations

References

External links
 

Living people
South African podcasters
South African DJs
South African musicians
Year of birth missing (living people)
Place of birth missing (living people)